Chantal Poirier (born December 25, 1985) is a Canadian former pair skater. With Craig Buntin, she won two medals on the ISU Junior Grand Prix series and qualified for the 1999–2000 JGP Final, where they placed sixth. They represented Canada at the 2000 World Junior Championships and finished eighth. After their partnership ended, Poirier teamed up with Ian Moram, with whom she competed together for two seasons. They received one senior Grand Prix assignment, the 2001 Skate Canada International, where they placed seventh, and won the bronze medal at the 2001 Golden Spin of Zagreb.

Poirier also competed as a single skater but had no notable international appearances.

Competitive highlights

With Moram

With Buntin

References
 
 Pairs on Ice: Poirier & Sturdy
 Pairs on Ice: Poirier & Buntin
 Pairs on Ice: Poirier & Moram

External links
 Tracings.net: Chantal Poirier (singles)

Canadian female pair skaters
1985 births
Figure skaters from Montreal
Living people